Nicolae Pantea (born 12 February 1946) is a Romanian former footballer and manager, a glory of Steaua București. He used to play as a midfielder.

Club career

Nicolae Pantea started his career in 1961, playing for the youth team of Rapid, a team from Arad. Three years later, Pantea moved to UTA Arad. He spent two years playing for UTA, making also his debut in Divizia A.

In 1966, Pantea is sold to Steaua București, where he plays for a period of nine years, making 196 appearances in Divizia A and scoring 24 goals. He won four times the Romanian Cup and once the Romanian championship.

In the last two years of his career, Nicolae Pantea played for Petrolul Ploieşti in Divizia B, winning the promotion to Divizia A in 1977. After a short period, Pantea announced his retirement.

International career

Nicolae Pantea made his debut for Romania in a friendly which took place April 1972 against Peru. In his last match for the national team, he scored his first and only goal for The Tricolours, it was the fifth goal of a 9–0 victory against Finland at the 1974 World Cup qualifiers.

International goals

Honours

Club
Steaua București
Romanian Divizia A (1): 1967–68
Cupa României (4): 1966–67, 1968–69, 1969–70, 1970–71

Petrolul Ploieşti
Romanian Divizia B (1): 1976–77

Notes

References

External links 

1946 births
Living people
Romanian footballers
Olympic footballers of Romania
Liga I players
FC UTA Arad players
FC Steaua București players
FC Petrolul Ploiești players
Romania international footballers
FC Steaua București assistant managers
People from Arad County
Romanian football managers
FC UTA Arad managers
Association football midfielders